This is a list of short films that appeared on Nickelodeon, Nicktoons and Nick Jr.

Nickelodeon USA (original short series)

Tip-Top! with Suzy Prudden (1982)
In a carefully created six-segment series of progressive exercises, Suzy Prudden leads a group of kids through fun and stimulating warm-up activities and exercises. The series was released on VHS by Warner Home Video in 1982.

Inside-Out Boy
These shorts followed a boy who accidentally swung over the bar of the swing set, causing his body to flip inside-out. The shorts were animated in claymation by Sculptoons. It was later featured in a bumper for TeenNick's The '90s Are All That. Two shorts each can be seen on the Rugrats VHS tapes "Tales from the Crib" and "A Baby's Gotta Do What a Baby's Gotta Do".

Episodes

The Adventures of Pete and Pete

Nick Days (1994–1997)
This 30-second short series describes a different holiday (both official and created for the series) every day.

Orange Carpet
This long-running Nickelodeon interstitial series (formerly known as "Nicksclusive" from 1995 to 2011) promotes or takes a behind-the-scenes look at a movie or (until the early 2000s) a Nickelodeon show.

The Non-Adventures of Safety Queen
Shorts featuring a young, redheaded girl (voiced by Katrina Johnson of All That) with the alias of Safety Queen who helps kids overcome their fears by advising them against it, giving ridiculous scenarios of what would happen if they went for it, but the kids ignore this and do it anyway and realize there was nothing to fear after all. Three shorts were produced in 1995; they can be seen on the Rugrats VHS tape Phil and Lil: Double Trouble.

The Space Between Mr. Frear's Ears
A man named Mr. Frear hears music in everyday situations. Five shorts were created and directed by the creators of Stomp in 1995.

Weird Answer Kommand
A cartoon short series presented three anthropomorphic animal friends, a vixen, a kangaroo and a panda, ventured through bizarre missions.

As Our School Bus Turns
A parody of As the World Turns taking place on a schoolbus. Bus No. 9, a pilot based on the shorts, aired on Nickelodeon on June 28, 1998.

Inside Eddie Johnson
Some shorts were featured, but switched into a television series which rumored to air on The Big Orange (rebranding Noggin, now Nick Jr.). Produced in 1995 and filmed in 1996.

Natalie's Backseat Traveling Webshow
Shorts were featured online.

A Show of Hands
Black-and-white sketches acted out by hands.

Ted the Head

The Girl with Her Head Coming Off
Hence her name, a kid removes her head and flashes back to her memories before redonning it.
Shorts
 Inner Boots
 Zoey the Cat Passes Away
 Planetarium
The short where she flashed back to her boyfriend was just featured on KaBlam!.

I Am Poem

TechNick
A teenager answers questions about computers and the internet. Nine shorts were produced by Robert Zammarchi and Big Blue Dot in 1999.

Nick Extra (2004–2008)
From 2004 to 2008, commercial breaks on Nickelodeon usually began or ended with a Nick Extra short. These included:

Quicktoons: Short animations that end with a Nickelodeon logo.
Interpretives: Nickelodeon characters being created out of different things.
A Closer Look and Inside the Nicktoons Studio: Behind-the-scenes videos about Nickelodeon shows.
Fanimation: Short animations based on viewer-submitted stories.
Puzzles involving guessing a Nickelodeon character.
Purple and Brown: Short animations that feature two clay blobs. Animated by the British Aardman.
Neopets: Short animations based on the web game.
Helpful Hints for Humans
Primo

Nickelodeon USA (one-shot shorts)

The Rebus (1990)
A two-part short where Wendell Craig and a young girl solve a claymation rebus puzzle from offscreen. Wendell fails the puzzle in "The Rebus", but the girl figures it out ("Nickelodeon: It's What You Want") in "The Rebus Again".

We Are The Shrimpskins (1995)
A live-action Snick Snack short created by Stephen Holman and Josephine Huang, who would also create Life with Loopy for KaBlam! The Shrimpskins, Slim and Wally, watch a Sofa Ranch commercial and want to trade in their couch for a new one so they can win a fun weekend with the craziest people in the world. The Shrimpskins' couch won't fit through their door until Wally chainsaws the couch into little pieces and mails them individually. The Sloper family wins the competition, but the Shrimpskins are named the craziest people in the world. The Shrimpskins celebrate until the family arrives and they block off the door.

Zoom (1996)
An animated adaptation of the book by Istvan Banyai.

Innie and Outie (1996)
Two friends go to see a movie for the day. The faces are people's stomachs with facial features drawn on them to simulate speech and actions, like drinking.

The Right to Express Yourself (1997)
An intro featuring many languages leads into a short story about Zeebo, who likes to express himself, and his dad, who initially disapproves of Zeebo expressing himself. Zeebo and his dad eventually decide to express themselves together. The story was designed by Zolo Inc., animated by Pixar, and originally produced for UNICEF's "Cartoons for Children's Rights" campaign.

Antics (1998)
In this CGI short produced by Pitch Productions, ants play with a hula hoop-like object. One ant doesn't let another ant play with the object, but that ant gets to do so after it asks the other ant for a turn. This short aired on both Nickelodeon and Nick Jr.; Nick Jr.'s version, entitled "Ants, Ants, Ants", added an intro featuring an anthill.

The Human Lard in The Stupendous Holiday Finksten (1998)

Nickelodeon USA (acquired shorts)

One-shot shorts
From 1981 to 2000, Nickelodeon aired an original or acquired short film during the last commercial break of some of its shows, initially under the names Nickelodeon Short Feature (1981 to 1983) and Nickelodeon Breakaways (1983 to 1984). These included acquired one-shot shorts which usually aired after shows that ran less than 23 minutes; they were removed in 1994 due to Nickelodeon deciding to produce its own short series.

Bambi Meets Godzilla (Marv Newland)
The Cat Came Back (Cordell Barker)
Dog (Tanya Weinberger)
Dog Brain (J. Falconer)
Eternity (Sheryl Sardina)
Fast Food (Tanya Weinberger)
Grace (Tanya Weinberger)
Housecats (Peg McClure)
IKKKK! (Tanya Weinberger)
Excerpt from Joy Street (Suzan Pitt)
The Killing of an Egg (Paul Driessen)
Metal Dogs of India (Chel White)
Picnic on Imbrium Beach
Rock & Roll Pet Store (Michael Posch)
Skip It (Bill Snider)
Traveling Show (J. Stephan Leeper)
Waddles (Dan Collins)

Picture Pages

Bananaman

Watt the Devil
A series of under 30-second shorts produced by the British-based King Rollo Films. Watt the devil tries to do something but ends up hurting or humiliating himself.

Sports Cartoons

Muppet Beach Party
The Muppets cover "Kokomo" and "Wipe Out" in two music videos which aired on Nickelodeon in the mid-1990s.

Nick Jr. shorts

Nick Jr. Rocks

Belle, Bix, & Barker (1992)

Hocle and Stoty
Hocle and Stoty is an American short-form children's television series originally airing on Nickelodeon as part of the Nick Jr. block. The series was created by David Rudman and Adam Rudman and uses puppetry.

The series' production was documented in an art exhibit at the Art Center Highland Park in Highland Park, Illinois from 2010 until 2013.

Plot

Two irregularly shaped puppet creatures, Hocle and Stoty, have misadventures in Twilo Park, the far-off corner of Nick Jr.

Characters
Hocle is a tall pink-colored creature with a high-pitched voice. He, like his friend Stoty, wears a bowler hat.
Stoty is a short yellow being with a low-pitched, grumbly voice residing in Twilo Park.

Episodes

Count Along Time (1993)
These shorts encourage you to count to 10 twice, the second time in a different language. At the end you are congratulated with a stock cheering sound effect.

Nick Jr. Sings
Episodes

Max and His Alphabet Adventures
Max tells a story about an adventure he went on with a letter of the alphabet, which involves many words that begin with the letter; his dad tells him to go to sleep at the end of each short. Nine shorts were directed and produced by Lee Corey, Animation by CoreyToons.

Episodes

Face

Little Big Room (1994-95)
Flexy (Joey Mazzarino), Jam, and sometimes someone else do things in the Little Big Room.

Muppet Time
Episodes

Winky Love
The shorts centered on an African-American little girl explains what it's like to live in a big city. Animated by Bill Davis.

Episodes

What's the Buzz with Philomena Fly (1995)
Philomena Fly went somewhere and shows the live-action video of her visit she made with her BuzzyCam. Animated by DMA Animation.

Jungle Boogie
Clips of animals doing something are shown.

Episodes

Joey's Lunch
Anthropomorphic food come out of Joey's lunchbox and do something while promoting healthy eating. Four minute-long shorts were produced by Luna Vox Productions.

Episodes

Flexy's Little Big Question (1996)
A spin-off of Little Big Room where Flexy, sitting on a bench with two children, asks them a question.

Countin' Carl
A superhero helps children get over problems related to counting up to a specific number.

Episodes

Amby and Dexter
Amby & Dexter was a series of animated interstitials on Nick Jr. in 1997, created by Paul Fierlinger and his wife Sandra Schuette, and composed by John Avarese. The title is a play on the word "ambidexterity", meaning "the ability to use both hands", as the characters transform from a pair of hands.

Amby and Dexter are depicted as miniature bespectacled, dressed humans, free to move and think of their own accord. The two solve problems and never speak. Amby, the female hand, is playful and has a penchant for dancing to get from one place to another. Dexter, the male hand, is more serious and sometimes annoyed by Amby's antics, but never too bothered. After the two finished their task, they transform back into the original pair of hands.

Episodes

Wordville with Marc Weiner and Friends (1998)
In Wordville, Marc Weiner reveals a word, and then visits someone who can define the word.

Episodes

Nick Jr. Show and Tell
A child tells a story and shows the artwork s/he made to go along with it, accompanied by animation by Buzzco Associates. Produced by Lynn Kestin.

Episodes

Abby's Friends
Chris Gifford created this live-action short series in 1998 which lasted for three episodes. After Abby (played by Iyanna Dunn
Former actress now influencer) leaves her room, her stuffed animals (a cat, a cow, a dog, and a pig) come to life through puppetry and learn social skills. The cat and pig stuffed animals later appeared as animated characters in the Dora and Friends: Into the City! episode "The Search for Mono".

Maggie and the Ferocious Beast (1998)

Nick Jr. Presents (1999–2001)
An animated adaptation of a story, a vignette featuring Bill Cosby, or a song from Blue's Big Musical Movie is shown.

Nanalan'

Just Ask! (2000)
A child's misconception about something is corrected by an off-screen woman, whose answer is accompanied by a simple animation. Three shorts were produced.

Just for Me Stories (2001)
Episodes

Favorite Foods
A child makes a cartoon about his favorite food. Four shorts were produced by John Serpentelli in 2001.

Nickelodeon International

Race Rabbit
As Seen On KaBLaM! A live-action show about a romantic rabbit racer with a British accent who competes in races but there is really trouble along the way caused by the Boolies (Zit and Winston), who are his human enemies. Race Rabbit always wins the race, foiling the Boolies' plans along the way. The only KaBlam! short created in the United Kingdom. Created by Scott Fellows, who is also the creator of Johnny Test, They aired on Nickelodeon from 1998-2005.

Very Aggressive Vegetables
These shorts are about kids insulting a vegetable, and then the vegetable comes to life and goes crazy, destroying snacks or yelling at the kid. Six 30-second shorts were produced for Nickelodeon Australia by Fudge Puppy Productions in 1997.

Episodes

Cucumber
Baby Corn
Celery
Potato
Zucchini
Broccoli

Balinese Slapping Fish
Produced by Fudge Puppy Productions in 1998 for Nickelodeon Australia, the series involves an orange fish and green fish (a parody of Siamese fighting fish) who slap each other. Usually, something unrelated is happening as the two fish randomly appear, to the confusion and occasionally frustration of onlookers. Most of the shorts ends with the fish superimposed on a background with the title, which is said by a group of kids.

Episodes

Game Arcade
Fear Of Flying
Haunted House
Olympics
Gala Premiere
Blast Off Top 5 (only episode without outro)
Fight Night

Hot Chunks
These shorts star Angus King as a variety of characters. Thirteen minute-long shorts were produced for Nickelodeon Australia by Fudge Puppy Productions in 1998.

Gordon Bleugh
The shorts are claymation/stopmotion in nature, and are animated by Neville Buchanan. Several accounts describe this short as the misadventures of a claymation, anthropomorphic green frog in a chef's costume, often facing mishaps like malfunctioning equipment or a fly buzzing around the kitchen. Four shorts were produced by A for Animation and Elm Road Productions in 2000.

Schoolyard Safari
A young boy documents different types of boys at school.

Foul Facts
Produced by in 2002 for Nickelodeon Australia, this short consists the narrator teaching the kids about seemingly gross bodily fluids and unwanted symptoms, which include earwax, stinky feet, nose snot, etc. It lasted for 10 episodes. In the U.S., it re-aired on Nicktoons in 2002.

The Presentators
A stop-motion series about three presentators named Stefan, Brian and Dan who host Nickelodeon (changed to Nicktoons in U.S. airings) and usually fool around on camera. It was produced by Aardman Animations in 2002 for Nickelodeon UK.

The Adventures of Napman
An Australian animated series aired in 2005. It is about a superhero who is always sleeping on his cot with a sleeping mask, a red robe, and a pink blanket that acts as a cape, and is thus called "Napman." He travels by having his dog Billy pull his cot along. Even though his dog always saves the day, it is Napman that gets all the credit.

Billy is usually just doing dog things, like chasing a duck of cat, trying to urinate near a tree which seems to perfectly correlate with a problem that arises where he saves the day/solves it.

Aside from the opening theme, the only dialogue in the shorts is at the end, when one or more people praise Napman by saying, "Nice work, Napman!" He somehow never wakes up despite all the chaos around him.

The Undersea Monkeys
A series of one minute shorts that aired between advert breaks on Nickelodeon UK in May 2001 Created by Picasso Pictures and Steve Shannon. It consists of adventures featuring Three comical undersea monkeys who were transferred into Outer Space by the evil robot named Dr.Colossus, to be eaten by nocturnal aliens, including a humanoid red and green chicken, other adventures include disassembling a bomb and one of the characters get turned into a teapot and the three undersea monkeys have to escape from an underwater sea station before it self-destructs!

Nicktoons Network

Thumb Wrestling Federation
A live action animated series with thumbs and thumb puppets created by Larry Schwarz who created Kappa Mikey, It was shown on Nicktoons Network from 2006-2007 before been given to WBKids and then Cartoon Network, It was presented by Dick Thompson and Colonel Cossack where the sport of the TWF features The Mighty Dexteras going up against The Evil Sinistras,
Dexteras: Vini Vidi Victory!, Hometown Huck, Wasabi, Evil Ira, Unit 19G, Gary The Intern, Gill, Ouch, Dorsal Flynn, Tom Cat/Zombie Gonzales, Captain Esplanade, Pei Pei The Purple Panda, James Montgomery Flag, The Stash, Mr.Extremo, Face-Off Phil, Danny Kaboom, Fly Guy, Big Star and Mahi Mahi Mindy.
Sinistras: Senator Skull, The Big Time, N Fuego, Itsy Bitsy, Flashback, Corbata, The Scorchion, Sir Serpent, The Amoeba, The Lost Viking, The Visitor, Billy Batboy, Big Bad Billy Goatetsky, Rolf The Reaper, The Cheetah, Dwayne Bramage and Captain Carpal.
It ran for the first 2 seasons on Nicktoons Network.

Doodlez

Tortellini Western
The animated shorts centered on an Italian-American family and takes on with a cowboy-themed spin. It was first introduced in 2004.

Leader Dog
The shorts told the adventures of an ordinary dog captured by a race of aliens who mistakes him to be the "Earth's leader," as Leader lives on their home planet and introduces the aliens to the world of being a dog. Most episodes revolve around Leader introducing the aliens to a dog-like activity, such as drinking toilet water or chasing after mailmen. It aired on Nicktoons from April 18, 2004 until the year of 2008.

Fowl Play
The short's name is a pun on the phrase foul play. In Fowl Play, penguins and ducks play an exciting soccer game with music in the background. In the end, the music shifts, and a team of three ostriches catch the ball, ready to challenge the teams. It was made by Christopher DeSantis and won the Nicktoons Creator Award.

Edgar and Ellen

Short compilations

Short Films by Short People
In 1995, Nickelodeon introduced a series of short films developed by children based on a given prompt. The shorts ended with a segment about how they were made. The Short Films by Short People shorts premiered as Snick Snack interstitials during Nickelodeon's SNICK block. On December 21, 1997, Nickelodeon aired "The First Ever Short Films by Short People Film Festival", a half-hour special highlighting six of the shorts. Sister channel Noggin also aired the shorts under the title "Out of Your Mind".

Episodes

KaBlam!
Shorts from the KaBlam! series such as Sniz & Fondue, Action League Now!, Prometheus and Bob, Life with Loopy, and sometimes The Off-Beats were once shown during commercial breaks on Nicktoons. Life with Loopy and Prometheus and Bob were the most played.

Toons From Planet Orange (1998/2000)

Spider and Fly

This was a series of claymation shorts about a spider trying to get a fly. The fly always outwits him, however. Thirteen shorts were produced by Elm Road On The Box; the first one was also shown during Nickelodeon's TV special "Toons from Planet Orange".

Snout

This is about animals with snouts who dance to music. They babysit two baboon twins as the mother comes in on chaos. Three shorts were produced by Fudge Puppy Productions; the first one was also shown during Nickelodeon's TV special "Toons from Planet Orange".

Ego from Mars

This is about a group of aliens and a robot who try to take over the earth, but fail at doing so. Created by the Australian Mark Gravas, who is best-known for working Yakkity Yak.

Frog's Life/Vida De Sapos

Two frogs attempt to cross a busy road, but the big frog gets run over despite the little frog warning him. Produced by Metrovisión Post Producción.

Toons from Planet Orange II
The second season of Toons from Planet Orange aired as a television special in international markets. In the U.S., the shorts aired on Nickelodeon and Nicktoons, and on Nick.com as "Nick.com Toons".

The Boy from Woy

Produced by MudFish Studios, this is about a boy with a rubber glove on his head who has a magical remote control that can stop, fast forward, and rewind things. The premise is similar to that of the 2006 film Click.

Jerk Chicken & Fish Out of Water

This is about a chicken who becomes a police officer and a fish who just sits there. The chicken pushes people around, and the fish saves the day when he swallows the "psycho pooch" that the chicken is scared of. Created by Chris Gilligan (also the voice of Jerk Chicken) and produced by Pitch Productions.

Bobby the Lizard Boy

This is about a half iguana/half boy, with a babysitter named Laura. Bobby attempts to foil her every plan, and he ends up eating her.

Ernie & Trafalgar

Ernie's dog Trafalgar needs to "water the tree," but just crossing the street to get to the tree turns into an adventure for him. While waiting for the light to turn green, Ernie's imagination runs wild, and a giant mutant plant spells relief for Trafalgar. He almost gets eaten by a shark, but Trafalgar manages to save him in his misery.

Monster Vs Monster

Produced by Ian Carney and Ian Culbard. A brother and a sister make monsters in their imagination during bedtime to fight one another.

Music Monster

This one-shot sketch is about a monster who sings and tries to get some milk.

The Little Freaks

This is a one-shot sketch about a trio of friends that have various abnormalities (one girl has three eyes, there is a pair of Siamese twins, and one boy has a brain in a glass), and they save the world from a villain named Noface. This short was also aired on an episode of KaBlam!

Shorts based on Nickelodeon series

CatDog
These are the two pilot films of CatDog that aired before the show existed.

Astrology with Squidward
Astrology with Squidward was a series of shorts that ran from 2000 to 2001 on Nickelodeon. The shorts featured Squidward Tentacles from SpongeBob SquarePants giving humorous horoscopes, relating the Zodiac signs to characters on the show.

The Crimson Chin & Cleft, the Boy Chin Wonder
These shorts, produced in 2001, feature characters from The Fairly OddParents and resemble a moving comic book. The shorts follow the Crimson Chin and Cleft, the Boy Chin Wonder as they fight crime in the Chin's comic book. These also appear as "we'll be right back" and "now we're back" signs in early Fairly OddParents episodes.

Jimmy Neutron: Boy Genius
Nickelodeon commissioned a series of shorts in 2001 to promote the Jimmy Neutron: Boy Genius movie. Some episodes include Hyper Corn, Sea Minus, and Ultralord vs. the Squirrels. Several of these shorts were made into games on Nick.com.

Mr. Meaty
The shorts from which the show originated.

Avatar: The Last Airbender
Shorts featuring the cast of Avatar: The Last Airbender super deformed. There have been three.

The Loud House

References

s
Lists of short films